In geometry, symmedians are three particular lines associated with every triangle. They are constructed by taking a median of the triangle (a line connecting a vertex with the midpoint of the opposite side), and reflecting the line over the corresponding angle bisector (the line through the same vertex that divides the angle there in half). The angle formed by the symmedian and the angle bisector has the same measure as the angle between the median and the angle bisector, but it is on the other side of the angle bisector.

The three symmedians meet at a triangle center called the Lemoine point. Ross Honsberger has called its existence "one of the crown jewels of modern geometry".

Isogonality
Many times in geometry, if we take three special lines through the vertices of a triangle, or cevians, then their reflections about the corresponding angle bisectors, called isogonal lines, will also have interesting properties.

The symmedians illustrate this fact. 
 In the diagram, the medians (in black) intersect at the centroid .
 Because the symmedians (in red) are isogonal to the medians, the symmedians also intersect at a single point, . 
This point is called the triangle's symmedian point, or alternatively the Lemoine point or Grebe point.

The dotted lines are the angle bisectors; the symmedians and medians are symmetric about the angle bisectors (hence the name "symmedian.")

Construction of the symmedian 

Let  be a triangle.

first proof. Then:

second proof.

third proof. Since 
 

fourth proof. Let  be the midpoint of the arc . From that, we know that the circumcircle is an Apollonian circle with foci . So  is the bisector of angle , and we have achieved our wanted result.

Tetrahedra
The concept of a symmedian point extends to (irregular) tetrahedra. Let  be the midpoint of the side . The plane containing the side  that is isogonal to the plane  is called a symmedian plane of the tetrahedron. The symmedian planes can be shown to intersect at a point, the symmedian point. This is also the point that minimizes the squared distance from the faces of the tetrahedron.

References

External links
 Symmedian and Antiparallel at cut-the-knot
 Symmedian and 2 Antiparallels at cut-the-knot
 Symmedian and the Tangents at cut-the-knot
 An interactive Java applet for the symmedian point
 Isogons and Isogonic Symmetry

Straight lines defined for a triangle